I7, i7, or I-7 may refer to:

 Intel Core i7, a brand of Intel processors
 BMW i7, an electric luxury sedan
 Inline-seven engine or straight-seven engine
 Interstate 7, a proposed Interstate highway in California
 I7, in music tonic, the secondary supertonic chord of IV
 i7, the former web portal for Seven Network, replaced by Yahoo7
 , an Imperial Japanese Navy submarine launched in 1935 and wrecked in 1943
 Paramount Airways' IATA code